All Your Fault: Pt. 2 is the third EP by American singer Bebe Rexha. It was released on August 11, 2017, as the follow-up to her second EP released in February of the same year, All Your Fault: Pt. 1. It features guest appearances from Gucci Mane, 2 Chainz, Lil Wayne, Kranium and Florida Georgia Line. The EP's lead single, "The Way I Are (Dance with Somebody)", was released earlier on May 19, 2017. The second single, "Meant to Be" released on October 24, peaked at number two on the Billboard Hot 100, and at number one on the Billboard Hot Country Songs chart.

Background
Following the announcement of an expected release date of May 2017 and several delays and pushbacks, Bebe Rexha announced All Your Fault: Pt. 2 on June 29, 2017, and revealed its cover art. Louis Tomlinson's single in collaboration with Rexha and Digital Farm Animals, "Back to You", was initially rumored to appear on the EP. The EP was made available for pre-order on June 30, 2017.

"I Got Time" was intended to be titled as "What I Want" because of possible confusion with Rexha's previous single "I Got You", however days before the release, Rexha had changed her mind and returned to the original name.

Release and promotion
"The Way I Are (Dance with Somebody)" featuring Lil Wayne was released as the lead single from the EP on May 19, 2017. The music video premiered on June 1, 2017.

"That's It" featuring Gucci Mane and 2 Chainz was released as a promotional single on August 4, 2017.

In support of the EP and American singer and songwriter Marc E. Bassy's debut album, Rexha planned to go on a co-headlining tour across the United States, the Bebe & Bassy Tour in October 2017. The tour was short-lived due to an infection putting Rexha on strict vocal rest, with Marc E. Bassy eventually going on a solo US tour in March 2018.

On October 24, 2017, "Meant to Be" was released as the second single from the EP with a music video premiere one the day before and has accumulated a total of 941 million views as of October 16, 2020. The song debuted at number one on the Hot Country Songs chart, becoming Rexha's first number one on the chart and the longest-running number-one single in the chart's history. It also peaked at number two on the Billboard Hot 100, making it Rexha's highest-charting single on the chart.

Track listing
Credits taken from Qobuz and ASCAP.

Notes
 signifies an additional vocal producer

Sample credits
"The Way I Are (Dance with Somebody)" contains an interpolation of "I Wanna Dance with Somebody (Who Loves Me)", written by George Merrill and Shannon Rubicam, performed by Whitney Houston.

Personnel
Credits adapted from the liner notes of All Your Fault: Pt. 2.

Performers and musicians

Bebe Rexha – lead vocals, background vocals
2 Chainz – featured artist 
Florida Georgia Line – featured artists , background vocals 
Kranium – featured artist 
Gucci Mane – featured artist 
Lil Wayne – featured artist 
David Garcia – drums , keys , guitars 
Jason Gill – bass , all instruments 
Andrew Watt – additional vocals 

Production

Devon Corey – additional vocal engineering , vocal recording , engineering 
Jay Franco – mastering 
Frank Dukes – production 
David Garcia – engineering , programming 
Serban Ghenea – mixing 
Jason Gill – production , vocal recording 
Josh Gudwin – mixing 
Jonas Jeberg – production 
Joel Little – production 
Manny Marroquin – mixing 
Joey Moi – additional vocal production 
Murda Beatz – production 
Will Quinnell – mastering 
Stargate – production 
Spike Stent – mixing 
Andrew Watt – vocal engineering 
Willshire – production 

Design and management

Marius Sperlich – photography

Charts

Weekly charts

Year-end charts

Release history

References

2017 EPs
Warner Records EPs
Bebe Rexha albums
Albums produced by Frank Dukes
Albums produced by Joel Little
Albums produced by Murda Beatz
Albums produced by Stargate
Albums produced by Joey Moi